is a Japanese manga series written and illustrated by Masakazu Ooi. It has been serialized in Shōnen Gahōsha's seinen manga magazine Monthly Young King (later Young King OURs GH) since December 2008.

Premise

Publication
The magazine was rebranded as  starting on August 16, 2013. Shōnen Gahōsha has collected its chapters into individual tankōbon volumes. The first volume was released on September 18, 2009. As of May 16, 2022, nineteen volumes have been released.

Volume list

See also
Ashitaba-san Chi no Muko Kurashi, another manga series by the same author

References

Comedy anime and manga
Marriage in anime and manga
Seinen manga
Shōnen Gahōsha manga